25 meter rapid fire pistol is one of the ISSF shooting events and is shot with .22 LR pistols. The event has been a part of the Olympic program ever since the beginning in 1896, although its rules changed greatly before World War II, after which they were only slightly changed until the two major revisions of 1989 and 2005. The latter restricted the event to sport pistols, thereby banning .22 Short cartridge (last used in 2004 and replaced by .22 Long Rifle in 2005) as well as encircling grips and low trigger-pull weight. This caused a decline in results, as evidenced by a comparison of the world records under the pre-2005 rules (597) and post-2005 rules (593).

Instead of dropping specialized rapid fire pistols, manufacturers designed new pistols, such as the Walther SSP, conforming to the standard pistol requirements, but optimized for the rapid fire event.

Course of fire 

Traditionally, RFP competitions use paper targets that are able to turn 90 degrees to appear to the shooter and then turn back to disappear when the shooting time is up. During the last few decades, these targets have gradually been replaced by electronic devices which use red and green lights to indicate the beginning and the end of the shooting time, and which automatically handle late shots. As these systems are expensive, they are normally only used in international competitions.

A series (or string) consists of five shots fired at one target each within a limited time. The targets stand next to each other at a 25 m distance from the shooter. As with all ISSF pistol disciplines, all firing must be done with one unsupported hand. When the targets appear or when the green light comes on, the competitor must raise his arm from a 45 degree angle starting position and fire his five shots. If a shot is too late, it will score as a miss.

There are three different time limits for the series: 8 seconds, 6 seconds, and 4 seconds. A stage consists of two series of each type, and a full course of fire comprises two such stages, or a total of 60 shots. Since the targets are divided into concentric score zones with 10 being the most central part, the total maximum score is 600.

In major competitions, the top six shooters qualify for a final round of four additional 4-second series, with a shot scoring at or above 9.7 being counted as a hit, or a miss otherwise. The results of the qualification round and the final are added together, and any ties are broken by firing an additional 4-second series.

World Championships, Men

World Championships, Men's Team

World Championships, total medals

Current world records

Olympic and World Champions 

The dominant shooter of the event has been Ralf Schumann of Germany with a total of five major World-level Championship titles, with three Olympic gold medals and two Individual World titles. He is the first and one of the only two shooters to have won a particular Olympic event three times, and is the first of three shooters to have won three individual Olympic titles. Károly Takács and Józef Zapędzki also won two consecutive Olympic titles. Huelet Benner won two consecutive World Championships.

A rare double is that between this rapid fire event and its direct opposite 50 metre pistol; this has only been accomplished by Alfred Lane (completed in 1912), Torsten Ullman (1939), Huelet Benner (1952) and Pentti Linnosvuo (1964), with Lane (both events at the 1912 Olympics) and Linnosvuo using only Olympic titles. Benner, on the other hand, is the only shooter with two titles in both events.

References

External links 
 The International Shooting Sport Federation—Official site

ISSF shooting events
Handgun shooting sports